André Huret (28 May 1891 – 20 September 1964) was a French racing cyclist. He rode in the 1919 Tour de France. Huret's company made derailleur gear systems from the 1930s to the 1960s.

References

1891 births
1964 deaths
French male cyclists
Place of birth missing